Medallion Records was a record label (1919–late 1921 or early 1922) owned by the Baldwin Piano Corporation of Cincinnati, Ohio.

Most Medallion issues were pressed from masters leased from Emerson Records, whose catalogue included early jazz recordings by the Louisiana Five and Eubie Blake.

Kapp Medallion

At least four LPs were issued in the 1960s on the Kapp Medallion label. Kapp Records, Inc., was a firm in New York City that had no association with the original Medallion label.

See also
 List of record labels

References

American record labels
Record labels established in 1919
Record labels disestablished in 1921
Jazz record labels